Local elections to rural local bodies in the Indian state of Andhra Pradesh were held on 6 April 2014. These were the last elections to rural local bodies in the then united Andhra Pradesh before bifurcation into Andhra Pradesh and Telangana.

Results

Results in Andhra Pradesh 
Indirect elections

Results in Telangana 
Indirect elections

References

Notes 

Elections in Andhra Pradesh
2014 elections in India